Cedarhurst Center for the Arts is a visual and performing arts institution in Mount Vernon, Illinois. Located on a 80-acre campus, it offers classes in art education, drawing and painting, ceramics and stained glass, knitting and quilting, and hosts concerts and community events. Among its facilities are the Mitchell Museum, the Kuenz Sculpture Park, the Shrode Art Center (art education), the Schweinfurth House, and the Performance Hall inside the Mitchell Museum.

Mitchell Museum
The Mitchell Museum - named for John R. and Eleanor R. Mitchell, who bequeathed their art collection to Cedarhurst in 1973 - contains a collection of American paintings including works by Mary Cassatt, Thomas Eakins, William Glackens, Robert Henri, George Luks, John Sloan, and other early-20th-century masters.

History
A significant personal art collection was the reason John and Eleanor Mitchell planned a museum in rural southern Illinois. The museum was built to house the couple's collection of late 19th and early 20th century American paintings and artifacts. The collection included works from their friend and fellow collector John Parish, of Centralia, Illinois. The Mitchells acquired their artwork over four decades. In 1965, they established the Mitchell Foundation to build the Mitchell Museum at Cedarhurst and the Mitchell Museum opened in 1973. Both John and Eleanor died before the museum was completed.

Today
In the past 40 years, Cedarhurst has grown into a cultural mecca spread over 80 acres. The original two-room museum has expanded into a 33,000-square-foot cultural center with four galleries (one of which exhibits works from the Mitchell collection), an interactive family learning center, and a performance hall. The campus is also home to the Shrode Art Center, which includes a gallery, classrooms, and studio space; the historic Mitchell Home and Schweinfurth House, used for special events and meetings; and the Goldman-Kuenz Sculpture Park which features contemporary sculpture.

Mitchell Home
John and Eleanor Mitchell built their home in 1936. The house was designed by Eleanor's father for the couple's 80-acre Mt. Vernon estate called Cedarhurst. John had named the property after the Mitchell ancestral home in Corinth, Illinois, which his great-grandfather had previously used as a safe haven for slaves traveling north on the Underground Railroad. The Mitchells had guard dogs roaming the Cedarhurst grounds much like John's great grandfather, albeit for a different reason. In 1949 the Mitchells remodeled the home and added the east and west wings, including major expansion and renovations to the kitchen. They entertained often in the renovated space, which others described as sophisticated and stylish, yet also comfortable. Town and Country magazine featured the residence in a four-page article entitled "Contemporary with Antiques" in November 1954. The article showed two of their paintings, Mrs. T in Wine Silk by George Bellows and Captain Jack Kelly by Waldo Pierce.

Today, the Mitchell House is maintained by the museum's operations staff and is used for meetings, special events, and facility rentals. It is not open to the public on a daily basis.

References

Bibliography
Kevin Sharp. Cedarhurst: The Museum & Its Collection. Mt. Vernon, IL: Cedarhurst Center for the Arts, 2008.  

Art museums and galleries in Illinois
Art schools in Illinois
Performing arts centers in Illinois
Museums in Jefferson County, Illinois
Sculpture gardens, trails and parks in the United States
Museums of American art